Ricardo de Rivera Rosario (born October 15, 1958) is an associate justice of the Supreme Court of the Philippines. He was appointed by President Rodrigo Duterte to replace Associate Justice Jose Reyes Jr.

Education 

Rosario received his Bachelor of Laws degree from the Ateneo Law School.

Career 
He started his career in law as a legal officer of the National Bureau of Investigation, and thereafter as senior corporate attorney in the Metropolitan Waterworks and Sewerage System.

Trial court judge 
Rosario was appointed senior assistant city prosecutor in Quezon City in 1994, where he served for three years. Rosario became the presiding judge of Manila Metropolitan Trial Court Branch 19 in 1997, then later as presiding judge of the Makati Regional Trial Court Branch 66 until he was promoted to the Court of Appeals in September 2005.

Appellate court 

On September 12, 2005, he was appointed Associate Justice of the Court of Appeals by then-President Gloria Macapagal Arroyo.

Rosario was Chairman of The Court of Appeals' Ninth Division. He held the position for 15 years until his appointment to the Supreme Court in 2020.

Associate justice of the Supreme Court 

On October 8, 2020, President Rodrigo Duterte appointed Rosario Associate Justice of the Supreme Court. Rosario filled the post vacated by Supreme Court Associate Justice Jose Reyes Jr., who had retired that September. He was chosen out of six other potential candidates, Court of Appeals (CA) Associate Justices Ramón Cruz, Japar Dimaampao, Jhosep López, Eduardo Peralta Jr., and María Filomena Singh, as well as Court Administrator Midas Márquez.

References 

1958 births
Living people
Associate Justices of the Supreme Court of the Philippines
20th-century Filipino judges
Justices of the Court of Appeals of the Philippines
Ateneo de Manila University alumni
People from Quezon City
21st-century Filipino judges